Nicholas A. Sanchez (born June 10, 2001) is an American professional stock car racing driver. He competes full-time in the NASCAR Craftsman Truck Series, driving the No. 2 Chevrolet Silverado for Rev Racing. He is the 2022 ARCA Menards Series champion.

Racing career

Sanchez began racing at the age of twelve in go-karts at his home track of Homestead-Miami Speedway.

Sanchez tried out for NASCAR's Drive for Diversity program and was accepted into it, and as a result, was given a ride with Rev Racing in the NASCAR Whelen All-American Series as well as the then-NASCAR K&N Pro Series East in 2019. He made his debut in both races of the doubleheader at South Boston Speedway and then made another start later in the year at New Hampshire. In only his second start in the series, Sanchez would win the pole for the second South Boston race.
 
He was also the recipient of the Wendell Scott Trailblazer Award in 2019.

When ARCA and NASCAR merged, the East Series and the ARCA Menards Series were brought together and rebranded in 2020, and Sanchez continued to compete for Rev Racing in the renamed ARCA Menards Series East. Sanchez became a full-time driver for the team in 2020, replacing Rubén García Jr. in the team's No. 6 car.

In 2021, Sanchez moved from the East Series to the main ARCA Menards Series, competing full-time in Rev's No. 2 car. (It was initially going to be the No. 6.) The team also switched from Toyota to Chevrolet that year. Sanchez got his first career ARCA win at Kansas in the season finale, while Ty Gibbs won the championship for that season.

On October 19, 2021, it was announced that Sanchez would be driving part-time in the NASCAR Xfinity Series for B. J. McLeod Motorsports while continuing to drive full-time for Rev Racing in the main ARCA Menards Series.  He would first pilot the No. 5 Chevrolet at Phoenix Raceway, and at Charlotte Motor Speedway in the No. 99. He would later depart the team afterwards to drive a partial schedule the No. 48 for Big Machine Racing starting at Bristol Motor Speedway. Sanchez would win three ARCA races (Talladega, Kansas, & Michigan) and the Championship in 2022 by 14 points over Daniel Dye.

On November 4, 2022, Rev Racing announced its expansion into the NASCAR Craftsman Truck Series, fielding the No. 2 Chevrolet for Sanchez in 2023.

Personal life
Sanchez's father immigrated to the United States from Cuba on the Mariel boatlift when he was eight years old. 

When Sanchez began competing in NASCAR, he moved from Miami to Cornelius, North Carolina, which is located in the Charlotte metropolitan area where the majority of NASCAR teams are based.

Motorsports career results

NASCAR
(key) (Bold – Pole position awarded by qualifying time. Italics – Pole position earned by points standings or practice time. * – Most laps led.)

Xfinity Series

Craftsman Truck Series

 Season still in progress
 Ineligible for series points

ARCA Menards Series
(key) (Bold – Pole position awarded by qualifying time. Italics – Pole position earned by points standings or practice time. * – Most laps led.)

ARCA Menards Series East

ARCA Menards Series West

References

External links
 
 Official profile at Rev Racing
 

Living people
2001 births
NASCAR drivers
ARCA Menards Series drivers
Racing drivers from Miami
American sportspeople of Cuban descent